Duhail is a district in Qatar, located in the municipality of Doha. The district's northern half accommodates the main base of the Internal Security Forces (also known as Lekhwiya) as well as Abdullah bin Khalifa Stadium, which serves as the home grounds for Qatar Stars League club Al-Duhail SC.

Etymology
The district's name is derived from "dahal", the Arabic term for cavern, and was named in recognition of a large cavern that exists in the region.

Landmarks
Fereej Duhail Stadium (managed by the Qatar Olympic Committee) on Bu Sidra Street.
Duhail Park on Al Galayel Street.
Qatar Paralympic Committee on Al Khattiya Street.

Transport
Mowasalat is the official transport company of Qatar and serves the community through its operation of public bus routes. Duhail is served by two bus lines, both of which depart from Al Ghanim Bus Station. Route 170 has stops at Duhail and Umm Salal Ali and a terminus at Umm Qarn, running at a frequency of every 120 minutes on all days of the week. The other route, route 172, has stops at Duhail and Al Kheesa New Road and a terminus at Al Kheesa, also running at frequency of every 120 minutes on all days of the week.

Major roads that run through the district are Duhail Street, Al Khafji Street, and Al Shamal Road.

Currently, the underground Al Duhail Metro Station is under construction, having been launched during Phase 2A. Once completed, it will be part of Doha Metro's Green Line.

Demographics

As of the 2010 census, the district comprised 1,091 housing units and 55 establishments. There were 7,059 people living in the district, of which 48% were male and 52% were female. Out of the 7,059 inhabitants, 61% were 20 years of age or older and 39% were under the age of 20. The literacy rate stood at 97.5%.

Employed persons made up 48% of the total population. Females accounted for 44% of the working population, while males accounted for 56% of the working population.

Education
The following schools are located in Duhail:

References

Communities in Doha